Fowey (meaning 'Beech Trees') is a port town and civil parish at the mouth of the River Fowey in south Cornwall, England, United Kingdom. The town has been in existence since well before the Norman invasion, with the local church first established some time in the 7th century; the estuary of the River Fowey forms a natural harbour which enabled the town to become an important trading centre. Privateers also made use of the sheltered harbourage. The Lostwithiel and Fowey Railway brought China clay here for export.

History

Early history
The Domesday Book survey at the end of the 11th century records manors at Penventinue and Trenant, and a priory was soon established nearby at Tywardreath.  the prior granted a charter to people living in Fowey itself. This medieval town ran from a north gate near Boddinick Passage to a south gate at what is now Lostwithiel Street; the town extended a little way up the hillside and was bounded on the other side by the river where merchants had their houses backing onto the waterfront. The natural harbour allowed trade to develop with Europe and local ship owners often hired their vessels to the king to support various wars, although the town also developed a reputation for piracy, as did many others at this time. A group of privateers known as the 'Fowey Gallants' were given licence to seize enemy vessels during the Hundred Years' War. In the 14th century the harbour was defended by 160 archers; after these were withdrawn, two blockhouses were built, one on each side of the harbour entrance. Despite these defences the town was attacked by Breton pirates in 1457. Place House, by the church, was successfully defended against the French but subsequently strengthened. This building still exists, but much remodelled. A small castle was built on St Catherine's Point, the western side of the harbour entrance, around 1540.  The defences proved their worth when a Dutch attack was beaten off in 1667.

The people of Fowey generally sided with the Royalists during the English Civil War, but in 1644 the Earl of Essex brought a Parliamentarian army to Lostwithiel and occupied the peninsula around Fowey. In August, a Royalist army surrounded Essex's troops and King Charles I himself viewed Fowey from Hall Walk above Polruan, where he came close to being killed by a musket shot. On 31 August, the Parliamentarian cavalry forced their way through the Royalist lines and retreated towards Saltash, leaving the foot soldiers to be evacuated by sea from Fowey. Essex and some officers did indeed escape, but the majority of the force surrendered a few days later near Golant and were then marched to Poole, but most died before reaching there.

Later history

 
The fortunes of the harbour became much reduced, with trade going to Plymouth and elsewhere instead.  Fishing became more important, but local merchants were often appointed as privateers and did some smuggling on the side.  Tin, copper  and iron mines, along with quarries and china clay pits became important industries in the area, which led to improvements at rival harbours.  West Polmear beach was dug out to become Charlestown harbour circa 1800, as was Pentewan in 1826.  Joseph Austen shipped copper from Caffa Mill Pill above Fowey for a while before starting work on the new Par harbour in 1829.  Fowey had to wait another forty years before it saw equivalent development, but its natural deep-water anchorage and a rail link soon gave it an advantage over the shallow artificial harbours nearer to the mines and china clay works.  Meanwhile, a beacon tower was erected on the Gribben Head by Trinity House to improve navigation into Fowey and around Par bay.

The Fowey Harbour Commissioners were established by an Act of Parliament in 1869, to develop and improve the harbour.  On 1 June in that year, the  broad gauge Lostwithiel and Fowey Railway was opened to new jetties situated above Carne Point, and in 1873, the  standard gauge Cornwall Minerals Railway (CMR) opened a line from Newquay and Par to further jetties between Caffa Mill Pill and Carne Point.  Both of these railways initially carried just goods, but on 20 June 1876, a passenger station was opened on the CMR on land reclaimed from Caffa Mill Pill.  The Lostwithiel line closed at the end of 1879 but was reopened by the CMR as a standard gauge line in 1895, and the short gap between the two lines at Carne Point was eliminated.  Passenger trains from Par were withdrawn after 1934 and from Lostwithiel in 1965.  The Par line was subsequently converted to a dedicated roadway for lorries bringing china clay from Par after which all trains had to run via Lostwithiel.

The Royal National Lifeboat Institution established Fowey Lifeboat Station near the Town Quay in 1922 to replace an earlier station at Polkerris. This was replaced in 1997, by a new facility in Passage Street. Two lifeboats are stationed at Fowey: Maurice and Joyce Hardy, a Trent Class all weather boat that is kept afloat opposite the lifeboat station, and Olive Two, an IB1 inshore lifeboat kept inside the station and launched by davit.

Fowey was the main port for loading ammunition for the US 29th Division that landed on Omaha Beach on D Day during the Second World War. There was a munitions siding at Woodgate Pill just north of Fowey,  originally built for the Great War conflict.

Governance

The seal of the borough of Fowey was On a shield a ship of three masts on the sea her topsail furled with the legend "Sigillum oppidi de Fowy Anno Dom. 1702".

Fowey elected two members to the unreformed House of Commons until the Reform Act 1832 stripped it of its representation as a rotten borough, it having lost its borough corporation a few years before. It was restored as a municipal borough in 1913, and then was merged with the nearby and much larger St Austell in 1968 to form the borough of St Austell with Fowey. This was itself in 1974 replaced with the Restormel Borough, which was replaced by Cornwall Council in 2009.

In local government terms, Fowey is now a civil parish with a town council and a mayor. Local government responsibilities are shared by the town council and Cornwall Council. Besides the town of Fowey itself, the parish includes the coastal area between the mouth of the River Fowey and St Austell Bay, including Gribben Head and the small settlements of Menabilly, Polkerris, Polmear and Readymoney.

The parish of Fowey lies within the St Austell and Newquay constituency of the United Kingdom Parliament. Prior to Brexit in 2020, it was in the South West England constituency of the European Parliament.

Geography 

Fowey is a small town, civil parish and cargo port at the mouth of the River Fowey in south Cornwall, England. It is at the entrance to a large flooded valley created after the last ice age by the melt waters that caused the sea level to rise dramatically, creating a large natural harbour which is navigable for its last seven miles.

 
Fowey is in the South Coast (Eastern Section) of the Cornwall Area of Outstanding Natural Beauty. It lies at the end of the Saints' Way and has ferries across the river to Polruan (foot) and Bodinnick (vehicle). There are many historic buildings in the town, including the ruins of St Catherine's Castle, while Readymoney Cove possesses a local beach.

At the time of the 2001 census, Fowey had a population of 2,273. This had increased slightly at the 2011 census to 2,395.  The Fowey electoral ward had a population of 4,690 in 2011.

Religious sites

Popular legend has it that Jesus visited Fowey as a child, along with Joseph of Arimathea who was a merchant visiting local tin mines in which he had a commercial interest. At the entrance to the River, on the eastern side below the cliffs to the south-west of St Saviour's Point, there is a cross to commemorate this supposed visit. This cross is marked on very early charts and was maintained by monks from Tywardreath. The cross is known locally as "Punches Cross", supposedly derived from the name of Pontius Pilate.

One hundred yards west of the lighthouse on the west of the harbour entrance, about thirty feet below the top of the cliff edge and broadly concealed, is a small grass area known as "Johnny May's Chapel". This name is believed to be that of a Methodist preacher at the time when Nonconformism was persecuted.

Fowey Parish Church
The church is dedicated to Saint Finbarr and is listed Grade I. It was built in the early 14th century and rededicated in 1336, replacing a previous Norman church. The church was damaged by the French in 1457, and repaired in 1460 by the Earl of Warwick, when the clerestory and the north and south aisles were rebuilt. There is a nave and two aisles with a clerestory, and the aisles are unusually wide; the aisles and the clerestory may be additions of the 15th century. The tower, of the 16th century, is of four stages and has buttresses and bands of ornament. There is an exceptionally fine 15th-century carved wagon roof. The south porch has open arches to the west and east and an eight-ribbed vaulted roof. The font is Norman, of Catacleuze stone, and similar to those of Ladock, Feock and St Mewan. The hexagonal pulpit was made in 1601. The monuments include two brasses of the mid 15th century and those of John Rashleigh, 1582, and Alice Rashleigh, 1602. The most interesting are two later Rashleigh monuments: John Rashleigh, c. 1610, and another of 1683. The church was used as a town hall for a period up to 1684. Sir Arthur Quiller-Couch is buried in the churchyard.

Economy

Fowey has thrived as a port for hundreds of years, initially as a trading and naval town, then as the centre for china clay exports.  Today Fowey is busy with trawlers and yachts.  Tourism is also an important source of income, contributing £14m to the local economy and accounting for more than half of the jobs in the town.

Transport
Although Fowey railway station closed to passengers in 1965, the Lostwithiel to Fowey branch line remains open for goods traffic, carrying bulk china clay to the jetties at Carne Point. First Kernow operate regular bus services, numbered 24 and Transport for Cornwall operate services numbered 25 (also service 24 early, late and Sundays), between Fowey, Par station and St Austell. The combined frequency varies from one bus per 1.5 hour on Sundays to two buses per hour on weekdays. From St Austell bus station connecting buses operate to other places in Cornwall. Town Bus is a frequent and regular service running from outside the church in the town centre to the main car park on Hanson Drive.

Both vehicle and foot ferry services cross the river to Bodinnick and Polruan.  A ship to shore water taxi service operates from Easter until the end of October and a foot ferry to the fishing village of Mevagissey runs from 1 May to 1 October, weather permitting.

Education
Fowey has two schools: Fowey Primary School and Fowey River Academy, both of which are in Windmill Road. Fowey Grammar School, for which its architect Silvanus Trevail received a silver medal, was demolished in 1999.

Culture 
Fowey has been the inspiration for many authors, including Sir Arthur Quiller-Couch ('Q'), Daphne du Maurier, Leo Walmsley and Kenneth Grahame. Michael Corrigan's novel, Brewer's Odyssey, 2019, has a few scenes set in Fowey, including the ghostly presence of Daphne du Maurier.
''Fowey was Quiller-Couch's main residence from 1892 onwards, and a number of his stories are set in 'Troy Town', a thinly disguised Fowey. The du Maurier Festival Society runs the Fowey Festival of Arts and Literature each May, the month of her birth.

Various visual artists have had close connection with Fowey and lived there, including Fred Yates (painter), Andrew Litten Amanda Hoskin who primarily paints the local coastline. and Mabel Lucie Attwell. Fowey holds an annual Christmas craft market.

An engraving of a painting by Thomas Allom entitled Fowey Harbour, St. Saviour's Chapel & Polruan Castle together with a poetical illustration by Letitia Elizabeth Landon, which recounts the repelling of the French 'out of her house' (that is, Place House) in Fowey by the wife of 'Thomas Treury, the 2d' in her husband's absence, around the time of Henry 6th, was published in Fisher's Drawing Room Scrap Book, 1832.

Sports
The surrounding coastline of Fowey is popular with fishermen and spear-fishermen. Many sea creatures can be seen all around the Cornish shoreline, including mullet, bass, mackerel, lobsters and cuttlefish. Many of the species can be seen in the Fowey Aquarium in the heart of the town, which includes a very rare Albino Bull Huss.

The Royal Fowey Yacht Club is based on the harbour front. A Pilot Gig Rowing Club races in and around Cornwall, with an event at Fowey being held the same week as the Regatta. The club launches from Caffa Mill slip. Fowey Golf Club was founded in 1894 and continued until the late 1940s.

Public services
A doctors' surgery called the 'Fowey River Practice' is situated in Rawlings Lane, and is part of a group including two other surgeries in the Fowey River Practice group, which are situated at Par and Polruan.

Notable people
 Charles Fitzgeoffrey an Elizabethan poet and clergyman was the son of the Rector of Fowey.
 Hugh Peters (or Peter), a 17th-century preacher, was born at Fowey.
Mary Bryant (born 1765) was born in Fowey before being transported as a convict to the colony of New South Wales, where she became one of the first escapees.
 John Whitehead Peard (1811–1880), a British soldier renowned as 'Garibaldi's Englishman' 
 Kenneth Grahame (1859–1932) most famous for The Wind in the Willows (1908) lived for part of the year in Fowey during the 1890s and into the early part of the 20th century.
 Sir Arthur Quiller-Couch (1863–1944) settled in Fowey in 1891 and remained there for the rest of his life. Quiller-Couch was an author and professor of English literature primarily recalled for his influential literary criticism.
 Mabel Lucie Attwell (1879–1964) was a British illustrator. She was known for her cute, nostalgic drawings of children, based on her daughter, Peggy. Her drawings are featured on many postcards, advertisements, posters, books and figurines. She settled in Fowey, dying here in 1964.
 Leo Walmsley (1892 – 1966) was an English writer. He died in Fowey, Cornwall, on 8 June and his house 21 Passage Street was named Bramblewick after his popular book series.
 Clarence F. Leary a United States Navy officer and Navy Cross winner was born here on 11 January 1894.
 Daphne du Maurier (1907–1989) English author and playwright; lived in Fowey. Her works include Rebecca, an adaptation of which won the best Picture Oscar in 1941, Jamaica Inn and numerous short stories including The Birds and Don't Look Now that were turned into films. 
 Antony Hewish (1924–2021), co-recipient of the 1974 Nobel Prize for Physics, was born here.
 Gordon Waller (1945-2009), of the singing duo Peter and Gordon, resided in Cornwall for eight years during his children's youth.  His family maintains a lifelong association with the village.
 Noël Goodwin (1927–2013), music and dance critic.

A number of entertainers have primary and secondary residences around the town including: Richard Madeley and Judy Finnigan, Dawn French, Gloria Hunniford, and former Blue Peter presenter Janet Ellis.

References

Further reading

Henderson, Charles (1935) Fowey. In: Essays in Cornish History'' edited by A. L. Rowse and M. I. Henderson; pp. 26–43

External links

 
 

 
Towns in Cornwall
Civil parishes in Cornwall
Ports and harbours of Cornwall
Ports and harbours of the English Channel
Cornish Killas